See You When I Am Famous (stylized as See You When I Am Famous!!!!!!!!!!!!) is the second studio album by American recording artist Kyle, released on July 17, 2020 by Atlantic Records. It follows the release of his 2018 debut record Light of Mine. The album was produced by Hit-Boy, Mick Schultz, SoFly and Nius, and Raphael Saadiq; with guest appearances from Tyga, Rico Nasty, Rich the Kid, K Camp, Trippie Redd, Iann Dior, The Drums, Bryson Tiller and Too Short. See You When I Am Famous!!!!!!!!!!!! debuted and peaked at number 124 on the Billboard 200 and spawned four singles: "Yes!", "What It Is", "Bouncin", and "Money Now".

Critical reception

Aaron Williams of Uproxx wrote that: "See You When I Am Famous!!!!!!!!!!!! isn't about shining on haters, or proving how tough Kyle can be. Instead, it's a call to action, an affirmation. Kyle isn't stunting out of spite, but to show that anyone can be a star, so long as they remain true to themselves and pursue what they love with determination, dedication, passion, and joy. It's about naming your dream, then claiming it, taking that moment to savor it — then becoming an example for the next generation to keep chasing their own." Neil Z. Yeung of AllMusic noted how the album reconnects with the K.I.D. persona by utilizing "languid bars and smooth sung vocals over fun and carefree production", concluding that: "Kyle offers an ideal sonic middle ground, delivering on the initial declaration of See You When I Am Famous!!!!!!!!!!!! by honoring his past and celebrating his position in the game in 2020." Joey Perkins of The Post felt that Kyle was caught between "sounding genuine and making another hit" throughout the record, saying it falters when attempting to recapture the Beautiful Loser style but praised the more contemplative tracks like "Over It" and "Bye", concluding that: "[W]ith a combination of "iSpy" imposters, tracks that are reminiscent of the younger KYLE and songs that sound more thoughtful and sincere, See You When I Am Famous!!!!!!!!!!!! is a very hit-or-miss project."

Track listing
Credits adapted from Tidal.

Charts

References

2020 albums
Albums produced by Hit-Boy
Albums produced by Raphael Saadiq
Atlantic Records albums
Kyle (musician) albums